A 44-Calibre Mystery is a 1917 American short Western film, featuring Harry Carey. Carey plays the role of Sheriff Cheyenne Harry. He saves Kitty Flanders from Pete McGuire and takes her safely home. McGuire hides in a shack on Mr. Flanders' stake and Harry's deputy is shot dead, apparently by Mr. Flanders. McGuire offers to keep quiet about the murder if Flanders gives him half a stake and his daughter's hand in marriage. Mr. Flanders confesses his crime to Sheriff Harry and learns that he is innocent. Sheriff Harry notices McGuire's gun and accuses him of the crime, but they are killed as they try to escape. The film concludes as Kitty Flanders confesses her love to Sheriff Cheyenne as she bandages his wounds from the fight.

Originally released in 1917, the film was later revised and re-titled as Sure-Shot Morgan  and possibly released in 1919, and also re-released under both names in 1922. The film garnered little critic attention and the first summary of the film came from the two-reel revised release with a positive review. The film was directed by Fred Kelsey and released by Universal Film Manufacturing Company. The film's status is unknown.

Plot
Set in the town of Driftwood, the film begins when Pete McGuire, known by the alias "Lone Jack" arrives in town and molests Kitty Flanders. Sheriff Cheyenne Harry intervenes and knocks down McGuire and takes Kitty Flanders to her home. McGuire becomes aware that Sheriff Harry's deputy, Horton, is out to arrest him and McGuire hides out on a shack on Flanders' claim. Horton is later killed, apparently by Mr. Flanders, and McGuire offers to keep quiet in exchange that he gives him half a stake in the claim and have Kitty Flanders marry him. Later, Sheriff Harry learns that Horton was killed by a 44-Calibre round. Mr. Flanders confesses to Sheriff Harry that he shot and killed Horton, but the sheriff points out that his gun was of a different size. Sheriff Harry notices that McGuire's gun is a 44-Calibre and accuses him of killing Horton. McGuire and an accomplice attempt to escape, but are killed by the Sheriff in a fight. Kitty Flanders confesses her love to Sheriff Cheyenne as she bandages his wounds.

Cast
 Harry Carey as Sheriff Cheyenne Harry
 Claire Du Brey as Kitty Flanders
 Hoot Gibson
 Frank MacQuarrie
 Vester Pegg
 William Steele credited as William Gettinger (Bill Gettinger)
 Maude Emory

Production and release
The screen story originates from T. Shelley Sutton and was adapted to the scenario by Charles J. Wilson. However, Exhibitor's Trade Review states that while Shelley Sutton wrote the film, the scenario was instead adapted by F. A. Meredith. The film was directed by Fred Kelsey. The Universal Film Manufacturing Company released the film on May 22, 1917, using the standard 35 mm spherical 1.37:1 format. The three reel film was marketed by Universal under the "Gold Seal" label and was advertised as a higher quality work that had a higher cost than other productions in return for bolstering the returns of a weak feature or show by drawing additional patrons.

The Silent Film Era website states that this film was edited down to two-reels and was re-released as Sure-Shot Morgan on September 4, 1922, and/or October 28, 1922. The April 1923 Motion Picture News Booking Guide states that Sure-Shot Morgan was released on September 4, 1922. However, an earlier reference exists for Sure-Shot Morgan as a Universal Special Attraction released on February 1, 1919. This mention also includes the note that the film was already in a two-reel state and stars Harry Carey. A newspaper record for a "Sure-Shot Morgan" appears on February 1, 1919, in  The Wichita Daily Eagle, but lacks further details. The next mention in a newspaper is in The Wilmington Morning Star on February 8, 1919, and attributes the star of Sure-Shot Morgan as Neal Burns and in another ad on the same page as Neal Hart. Despite the conflicting information, the next newspaper mentions of Sure-Shot Morgan occurs after the 1922 release date and notes again that Harry Carey stars in the film.

The revision down to two reels was kept for the re-release of A 44-Calibre Mystery. The film did not receive a much attention and the first summary of the plot occurred after its revision. Critical reception of the film and its analysis was scarce in publications. In 1922, the Exhibitors Trade Review said the two-reel reissue of A 44-Calibre Mystery is "good in spite of or perhaps because of the fact that it really is 'wild and wooley' as well." The original 1917 production was also said to be popular with fans of western melodramas.

The film's status is unknown, but it is presumably among the 90% of all American silent films that are lost.

See also
 Harry Carey filmography
 Hoot Gibson filmography

Notes

References

External links
 

1917 films
1917 Western (genre) films
1917 short films
American silent short films
American black-and-white films
Films directed by Fred Kelsey
Silent American Western (genre) films
Universal Pictures short films
1910s American films
1910s English-language films